Lychas srilankensis is a species of scorpion in the family Buthidae. It is endemic to Sri Lanka.

Description
Total length is 38 to 65 mm. Body is spotted with yellow and brown. The fifth metasomal segment is darker in colour than that of other segments. Sternum type 1 is subpentagonal and horizontally compressed. Sixth row of granules on both movable and fixed fingers of pedipalp lack external and internal granules. Prosoma spotted and evenly granulated with round granules. Mesosoma with same round granulation. Lateral infra-median carinae of second and third metasomal segments are incomplete. Fingers and manus of pedipalps are light yellow and spotted. Manus of pedipalps is smooth, but without granules in females, whereas it is usually finely granulated in males. There are 21 to 25 pectinal teeth. Telson distinctly subacular in shape and reddish and black in color. Rhere are some tricobothrias present in telson.

References

srilankensis
Animals described in 1997
Scorpions of Asia
Endemic fauna of Sri Lanka